T. A. Mathuram (14 October 1918 – 23 May 1974) was an Indian stage and film actress and singer.

Biography and career 
Mathuram was born in Srirangam on 14 October 1918 in a family of artists. Her first Tamil film was Rathnaavali released in 1935. Her next film was Vasantha Sena produced in Poone and released in 1936. She paired with N. S. Krishnan in this film. She married him later.

She and Krishnan became a popular comedy duo in South Indian cinema.

Indian playback singer Ramya NSK is a granddaughter of Mathuram.

Mathuram died in a road accident in 1974

Filmography

Ratnavali (1935)
Vasantha Sena (1936)
Baktha Thulasidas (1937)
Ambikapathy (1937)
Jothi Ramalinga Swamigal (1939)
Maya Machhindra (1939)
Pandurangan (1939)
Prahalada (1939)
Naveena Vikramadityan (1940)
Aryamala (1941)
Ashok Kumar (1941)
Vedavathi Alladhu Seetha Jananam (1941)
Alibabavum 40 Thirudargalum (1941)
Kannagi (1942)
Manonmani (1942)
Sivakavi (1943)
Mangamma Sabatham (1943)
Haridas (1944)
Poompaavai (1944)
Bharthruhari (1944)
Paithiyakkaran (1947)
Chandralekha (1948)
Amarakavi (1948) 
Nallathambi (1949)
Ratnakumar (1949)
Mangayarkarasi (1949)
Inbavalli (1949),
Parijatham (1950)
Laila Majnu (1950)
Manamagal (1951)
Vanasundari (1951)
Panam (1952)
Mudhal Thethi (1955)
Madurai Veeran (1956)
Ambikapathy (1957)
Yaar Paiyan? (1957)

References

External links

1918 births
1974 deaths
Actresses in Tamil cinema
Actresses from Tiruchirappalli
Tamil comedians
20th-century Indian actresses
20th-century comedians